These are the late night schedules on all three networks for each calendar season beginning September 1972. All times are Eastern/Pacific.

PBS is not included, as member television stations have local flexibility over most of their schedules and broadcast times for network shows may vary, CBS and ABC are not included on the weekend schedules (as the networks do not offer late night programs of any kind on weekends).

Talk/Variety shows are highlighted in yellow, Local News & Programs are highlighted in white.

Monday-Friday

Saturday/Sunday

By network

ABC

Returning Series
The Dick Cavett Show

New Series
ABC's Wide World of Entertainment

CBS

Returning Series
The CBS Late Movie

Not returning from 1971-72
The Merv Griffin Show

NBC

Returning Series
The Tonight Show Starring Johnny Carson
The Weekend Tonight Show

New Series
'''The Midnight Special

United States late night network television schedules
1972 in American television
1973 in American television